Kani Sabzeh (also Romanized as Kānī Sabzeh) is a village in Behi Dehbokri Rural District, Simmineh District, Bukan County, West Azerbaijan Province, Iran. At the 2006 census, its population was 108, in 24 families.

References 

Populated places in Bukan County